Belley is a commune in Eastern France.

Belley may also refer to:

Places  
 Canton of Belley
 Arrondissement of Belley

People 
 Jean-Baptiste Belley (c.1746–1805), former slave and member of the National Convention and the Council of Five Hundred of France
 Louis de Gonzague Belley, (1863–1930), Canadian politician
 Marlène Belley (born 1963), Canadian poet

See also 
 du Bellay family, a French noble family from the historic Anjou region
 Lisa Ann Beley (born 1967), a Canadian voice actress
 Belly (disambiguation)